Sun-Oka Beach Provincial Park is a provincial park in British Columbia, Canada. Established as Claybanks Beach Park in 1969, the park covers a total area of 30 hectares, the park also conserves 558m of shoreline and 100m of Okanagan Lake foreshore.

Conservation
A small portion of rare old growth cottonwood riparian habitat adjacent to Trout Creek is protected. The cottonwoods and associated wetland thickets provide food and shelter for a variety of birds, insects and small mammals. Birds seen in the area include the northern oriole, warbling vireos and the Lewis's woodpecker.

References

Provincial parks of British Columbia
Provincial parks in the Okanagan
Regional District of Okanagan-Similkameen
Protected areas established in 1969
1969 establishments in British Columbia
Articles containing video clips